Der Eiserne Mann (The Iron Man) is an old iron pillar partially buried in the ground in the German national forest of Kottenforst-Ville Nature Park, about two kilometers north-east of the village Dünstekoven. It is a roughly rectangular metal bar with about 1.2 m above ground and approximately 1.0 m below ground. The pillar is currently located at a meeting of trails which were built in the early 18th century through the formerly pathless forest area, but it is believed to have stood in another nearby location before that time.

The pillar is a unique oddity in Central Europe, and is alleged by some to be an out-of-place artifact. It was first mentioned in a 17th-century document, where it was used as a village boundary marker. There are some old aqueducts in the vicinity along with an ancient stone walkway. 

A metallurgical investigation in the 1970s showed that the pillar is made of pig iron. It was poured into an earthen trench, consistent with medieval methods of ironworking.Grewe, Klaus. Der Eiserne Mann im Kottenforst. Rheinlandverlag, Cologne, 1978.

After the long exposure to the weather, the iron man shows signs of weathering but there is remarkably little trace of rust. It is located at 50.70757° N by 6.96105° E at an elevation of approximately 159 m.

Sign content
The pillar is marked with a sign reading, in translation:

See also
Iron Pillar of Delhi

References

Eiserne Mann